Sanzhar Atkhamovich Tursunov (born 29 December 1986) is an Uzbekistani professional football player. He currently plays for FC AGMK.

Club career

Pakhtakor
He played for the youth team of the club and in 2006 moved to Russian football club FC Irtysh Omsk.

Irtysh Omsk
He played his first game for Irtysh Omsk on 23 April 2006. The first goal for the club he scored three days later in a match against Kuzbass Kemerovo from the second division. Up to the end of the season 2008 he played 86 matches and scored 13 goals.

FC Volga
In January 2009 he moved to Volga Nizhny Novgorod which promoted to Russian First Division. In the 2009 season Volga finished only 4th. One year later Volga gained promotion to the Russian Premier League and Tursunov scored 5 goals in the league and became one of the top assisting players of the First Division with 10 goal assists. In the 2010 season Sanzhar Tursunov scored 7 goals and 10 assists, playing 39 matches for Volga.

Alania Vladikavkaz
On 31 December 2011 he moved to Alania Vladikavkaz and signed a contract for 3.5 years.

Lokomotiv Tashkent
On 21 February 2013 Tursunov signed a contract with Lokomotiv Tashkent.

Honours

Club
Volga
 Russian First Division runner-up: 2010

International
 AFC Asian Cup 4th: 2011

Individual
 Uzbekistan Footballer of the Year : 2012

Career statistics

Club

International
Goals for Senior National Team

References

External links
 
 
 

1986 births
Living people
Uzbekistani footballers
Uzbekistani expatriate footballers
Uzbekistan international footballers
FC Volga Nizhny Novgorod players
2011 AFC Asian Cup players
2015 AFC Asian Cup players
Russian Premier League players
Ukrainian Premier League players
K League 2 players
Uzbekistan Super League players
Qatar Stars League players
Pakhtakor Tashkent FK players
PFC Lokomotiv Tashkent players
FC Spartak Vladikavkaz players
FC Vorskla Poltava players
FC Orenburg players
FC Irtysh Omsk players
Umm Salal SC players
Al Kharaitiyat SC players
Daejeon Hana Citizen FC players
FC Bunyodkor players
FC AGMK players
Uzbekistani expatriate sportspeople in Russia
Uzbekistani expatriate sportspeople in Ukraine
Uzbekistani expatriate sportspeople in Qatar
Uzbekistani expatriate sportspeople in South Korea
Expatriate footballers in Russia
Expatriate footballers in Ukraine
Expatriate footballers in Qatar
Expatriate footballers in South Korea
Association football midfielders